The Northern Lights is a blended Canadian whisky, 40% alcohol by volume, 80 proof. It is made with rye, barley and corn (maize). Each grain is fermented, distilled, and aged separately to produce grain whiskies. After distillation Northern Light whisky is aged separately for 36 months in white oak barrels of varying toasting levels. Northern Light Canadian Whisky is a brand owned by the Sazerac Company and bottled at the Barton Brands distillery in Bardstown, Kentucky.

References

External links
Black Velvet Whisky Homepage

Canadian whisky
Sazerac Company brands